Rocher-Percé is a regional county municipality in the Gaspésie–Îles-de-la-Madeleine region of Quebec, Canada.  Its seat is Chandler.  Prior to July 17, 1999 it was known as Pabok Regional County Municipality.

It is named after Percé Rock (the pierced rock), a massive arched sandstone rock rising from the Atlantic just off the tip of the Gaspé peninsula.  The region includes the towns of Percé, Grande-Rivière, Port-Daniel–Gascons and Chandler.  Major tourist attractions include the Percé Rock and Bonaventure Island.

Subdivisions
There are 6 subdivisions within the RCM:

Cities & Towns (3)
Chandler
Grande-Rivière
Percé

Municipalities (2)
Port-Daniel–Gascons
Sainte-Thérèse-de-Gaspé

Unorganized Territory (1)
Mont-Alexandre

Demographics

Population

Language

Transportation

Access Routes

Highways and numbered routes that run through the municipality, including external routes that start or finish at the county border:

Autoroutes
None

Principal Highways

Secondary Highways
None

External Routes
None

See also
 List of regional county municipalities and equivalent territories in Quebec

References

Regional county municipalities in Gaspésie–Îles-de-la-Madeleine
Census divisions of Quebec